Brandon Lamar Facyson (born September 8, 1994) is an American football cornerback for the Las Vegas Raiders of the National Football League (NFL). He played college football at Virginia Tech.

Professional career

Los Angeles Chargers
Facyson signed with the Los Angeles Chargers as an undrafted free agent in 2018. Facyson finished his rookie season with 3 tackles, playing in 15 games as well as both playoff games for the Chargers. In Facyson's second season he made his first professional start in a Week 2 loss to the Lions. Facyson finished his second season starting 4 games, playing in all 16, and recording 41 tackles.

Facyson was placed on the reserve/COVID-19 list by the team on November 7, 2020, and activated on November 25.

Facyson re-signed with the Chargers on March 19, 2021. He was waived on September 1, 2021 and re-signed to the practice squad the next day.

Las Vegas Raiders
On October 6, 2021, Facyson was signed by the Las Vegas Raiders off the Chargers practice squad. In Week 6 against the Denver Broncos, Facyson recorded his first career interception off a pass thrown by Teddy Bridgewater during the 34–24 victory.

Indianapolis Colts
On March 18, 2022, Facyson signed with the Indianapolis Colts.

Las Vegas Raiders (second stint)
On March 16, 2023, Facyson signed a one-year contract with the Las Vegas Raiders.

References

External links
Los Angeles Chargers bio

1994 births
Living people
Players of American football from Jacksonville, Florida
American football cornerbacks
Virginia Tech Hokies football players
Los Angeles Chargers players
Las Vegas Raiders players
Indianapolis Colts players